The 1977 UCI Track Cycling World Championships were the World Championship for track cycling. They took place in San Cristóbal, Venezuela in 1977. Twelve events were contested, 10 for men (3 for professionals, 7 for amateurs) and 2 for women.

Medal summary

Medal table

See also
 1977 UCI Road World Championships

References

Track cycling
UCI Track Cycling World Championships by year
International cycle races hosted by Venezuela
1977 in track cycling